The Digital pound (also known as digital sterling or britcoin) is a proposed central bank digital currency from the Bank of England. It is intended to supplement, not replace, cash in the United Kingdom. The value of the digital pound would be the same as cash pound sterling so that £10 of digital pounds would have the same value as a banknote of £10.

It differs from a cryptocurrency or cryptoasset as it is backed by the Bank of England and the Government of the United Kingdom.

A public consultation lasting four months on the digital pound was announced on 6 February 2023. A final decision on the implementation of a digital pound would be expected around 2025, with consumer usage expected in the late 2020s.

References

External links

Bank of England
Central bank digital currencies
2020s in the United Kingdom